Leonard Jacobson FAIA (March 7, 1921 – December 26, 1992) was an American museum architect. He worked with I. M. Pei on some of the major museum projects in the 20th century.

Biography 

Jacobson was born in Philadelphia, Pennsylvania, United States on March 7, 1921. He graduated from the University of Pennsylvania in 1942. He served in the United States Army Air Forces from 1942–45 during World War II. In 1947, he gained a Master of Architecture degree, also at the University of Pennsylvania.

In 1953, Jacobson started working with I.M. Pei, joining him at I. M. Pei & Partners, founded in 1955. He was a Partner in I. M. Pei & Partners (which became Pei Cobb Freed & Partners in 1989) from 1980–92. Jacobson was central to the following building projects in the US, mainly involving museums:

 East Building of the National Gallery of Art, Washington, D.C. (1978)
 West Wing of the Museum of Fine Arts, Boston, Massachusetts (1981)
 Portland Museum of Art, Portland, Maine (1982)
 Wiesner building, Massachusetts Institute of Technology, Cambridge, Massachusetts (1985)

At the end of his career in the 1980s and early 1990s, Jacobson was heavily involved with the modernization of the Louvre in Paris, France.
Jacobson was a Fellow of the American Institute of Architects. In 1989, he was made an Officier of the Ordre des Arts et des Lettres by the French government.

Leonard Jacobson died of a heart attack on December 26, 1992 at the age of 71 at his home in the village of Briarcliff Manor, New York, USA.

References 

1921 births
1992 deaths
Architects from Philadelphia
University of Pennsylvania School of Design alumni
United States Army Air Forces personnel of World War II
Fellows of the American Institute of Architects
Officiers of the Ordre des Arts et des Lettres
People from Briarcliff Manor, New York
20th-century American architects